Terapon jarbua,  the jarbua terapon, crescent grunter, crescent banded grunter, crescent perch, spiky trumpeter, thornfish or tiger perch, is a species of ray-finned fish, a grunter of the family Terapontidae. It occurs in the Indo-Pacific. it is an important commercial species within its range and is sometimes found in the aquarium trade where it is known as "target fish" for the pattern visible from above.

Description
Terapon jarbua is a medium-sized grunter with an oblong  body which is moderately laterally compressed. The oblique mouth is oblique with the jaws being of equal length and the maxilla reached the level of the front edge of the eye in juveniles and the centre of the eye in adults. It has conical, slightly recurved teeth which are set in bands with those in the outer rows being much enlarged, there are teeth on the roof of the mouth in juveniles but in many adults these are absent. There are 11 or 12 spines in the dorsal fin and 9 to 11 rays, the spiny portion is strongly arched, with the fourth to sixth spines being the longest and has a deep notch. The anal fin has 3 spines and 7 to 10 soft rays while the caudal fin is emarginate. They have 75-100 pored scales in their lateral line. They have a silvery white body which has 3 or 4 curved stripes from the nape to the rear of the body with the lowest stripe continues through the centre of the caudal fin. There is a black blotch on the spiny part of the dorsal fin between the third and sixth spines and the tail is striped with a black tip to each lobe.

Distribution

Terapon jarbua has a wide Indo-Pacific distribution which extends from the Red Sea and the coasts of eastern Africa as far south as South Africa through the Indian Ocean, including the Persian Gulf and into the Pacific Ocean as far east as Samoa, its range extends northwards to Japan and south to the Arafura Sea and Lord Howe Island. A single specimen was reported in 2010 from the eastern Mediterranean Sea, a likely entry from  the Suez Canal.

Habitat and biology
Terapon  jarbua is a euryhaline grunter which can tolerate a wide range of salinities from pure freshwater to up to 70% and so can live in a variety of habitats from purely marine areas through coastal waters, into estuaries, coastal lagoons and freshwater. It is mainly a marine species but it may move quite far up rivers where the water is fresh. Juveniles of T. jarbua can be numerous in intertidal area where there are sandy and are frequently recorded in tidal pools. This is a predatory species which feeds on smaller fishes but which also acts as a cleaner fish eating ectoparasites from larger fishes and is known to eat their scales which are high in calories. The distinctive colour and small scales of T, jarbua may be an adaptation to avoid attack by its conspecifics. They will also feed on insects and other invertebrates. The juveniles have been reported as being territorial and to have excavated craters in sand, possibly helping them to keep their position as the tide ebbs and flows. They can produce sounds using extrinsic muscles on the swimbladder have been shown to be used for communication and that these sounds to change both as the fish mature and with changes to the fish's environment, Although these fish have been reported as juveniles and adults in freshwater, reproduction takes place in the marine environment.

Fisheries
Terapon jarbua is fished for using all types of inshore fishing gear, including gillnets, traps, handlines and bottom trawls. These fish are sold fresh or in a dried and salted form. This species is infrequently available in the aquarium trade.

Taxonomy
Terapon jarbua was first formally described using the Arabic name Djarbua in a draft by Peter Forsskål. The description could have been by either Forsskål or by Carsten Niebuhr but it was compiled by the Danish naturalist Johan Christian Fabricius (1745-1808). The specimen came from the type locality given as Jeddah. It was used in the combination Sciaena jarbua in Descriptiones animalium and according to the authorship rules, should correctly be stated as Fabricius [ex Forsskål] in Niebuhr, 1775. The genus Terapon was created by Georges Cuvier in 1816 and in 1876 Pieter Bleeker then designated Holocentrus servus which had been described by Marcus Elieser Bloch in 1790 as the type species of the genus, this was considered to be a junior synonym of Terapon jarbua. Some authorities consider that the taxon currently named Terapon jarbua which has a wide geographic range is actually likely to be more than one species. One possible split would be between the western Indian Ocean species as originally described by Fabricius and the species Bloch described from Japan which would be Terapon servus.

References

External links
 

jarbua
Fish of Bangladesh
Fish of Indonesia
Fish described in 1775
Taxa named by Johan Christian Fabricius